The 2007 Tour of Chongming Island Time trial was the first time trial running on the Tour of Chongming Island.

General standings (top 10)

Results from CQ ranking.

See also
 2007 Tour of Chongming Island Stage race

References

External links
 Official website

Tour of Chongming Island
Tour of Chongming Island
2007 in Chinese sport